Nancy Drew and the Hidden Staircase may refer to:
 Nancy Drew and the Hidden Staircase (1939 film)
 Nancy Drew and the Hidden Staircase (2019 film)
 The Hidden Staircase, a novel in the Nancy Drew Mystery Stories series